Drawing the Line is a 1915 American short film directed by  B. Reeves Eason and starring Vivian Rich.

Plot

Cast
 Lillian Buckingham
 Webster Campbell
 Louise Lester
 Vivian Rich
 Walter Spencer

References

External links

1915 films
1915 short films
American silent short films
American black-and-white films
Films directed by B. Reeves Eason
Films with screenplays by Joseph F. Poland
1910s American films